Brandon McKinney (born August 24, 1983) is an American football nose tackle who is currently a free agent. He was signed by the San Diego Chargers as an undrafted free agent in 2006. He played college football at Michigan State.  He graduated from Chaminade-Julienne High School.

McKinney has also played for the Baltimore Ravens and Indianapolis Colts.

Professional career

San Diego Chargers
Brandon McKinney made his NFL debut for the San Diego Chargers in 2006. He was a quality backup nose tackle for two seasons there. McKinney was released by the Chargers on October 4, 2008 following the return of suspended linebacker Stephen Cooper.

Baltimore Ravens
McKinney was signed by the Baltimore Ravens on October 8, 2008 after nose tackle Kelly Gregg was placed on season-ending injured reserve. McKinney, then #68, recovered a fumble from  Pittsburgh Steelers QB Ben Roethlisberger.

McKinney was re-signed by the Ravens on February 17, 2009, preventing him from becoming a restricted free agent in the offseason.

In December 2009, the Ravens placed McKinney (now back to #91, which he wore for the San Diego Chargers) on injured reserve due to a back injury after just two tackles in 2009. In 2010, he would come back from injury and record 10 tackles for the Baltimore Ravens.

Indianapolis Colts
McKinney signed with the Indianapolis Colts on April 4, 2012. On August 6, 2013, McKinney was released with an injury settlement. On June 19, 2014, McKinney was re-signed by the Colts, but the Colts cut McKinney on August 30, 2014.

References

External links
Indianapolis Colts bio
Baltimore Ravens bio
Michigan State Spartans bio

1983 births
Living people
Players of American football from Dayton, Ohio
American football defensive tackles
Michigan State Spartans football players
San Diego Chargers players
Baltimore Ravens players
Indianapolis Colts players